The second largest city in Ireland, Cork, has an economy focused on the city centre, which as of 2011, supported employment for 24,092 people. According to 2006 figures, the top five employers in the area were public sector organisations, and included Cork University Hospital, University College Cork, Collins Barracks, Cork City Council and Cork Institute of Technology. Apple Inc. was the sixth largest employer, followed by Supervalu / Centra Distribution Ltd, Mercy University Hospital, Bon Secours Hospital and Boston Scientific.

Industry and workforce
Most of the industry in Cork is concentrated around the Greater Cork area, taking in Cork city and its hinterland. The immediate Cork city area has a population of almost 209,000 including the suburbs. Around 42,000 workers travel into the city and suburbs to work every day. The majority of those commuters come from Cork County (91%), Waterford City and County, and Kerry (2%). Some of the companies within this area include Pfizer (Pharmaceutical), GlaxoSmithKline (Pharmaceutical), Johnson & Johnson (Pharmaceutical), EMC (Data Storage), Apple Inc. (European HQ), Avery Dennison (Financial Shared Services), Siemens Group (Third party multi-lingual tech support) and the Marriott Group (Shared Services and Customer Service Contact Centre), Centocor (Biopharmaceutical Manufacture), McAfee (Security Software, EU Operations Centre), VMware (Enterprise Software and International Support/Shared Services Centre), Clearstream and Amazon.com (Customer Services – On line Retail Activities).

There are two key third-level institutions in the city, Munster Technological University (MTU) and University College Cork (UCC), which are the sixth and third largest employers in the city respectively - the latter employing approximately 2,800 people.

Information Technology and pharmaceuticals

Information Technology multinationals such as Apple, Amazon, EMC, IBM, McAfee Ireland Limited, SolarWinds, Siemens and VMware INC have a presence in the city. As of 2017, there are about 140 multinationals operating out of Cork, which employ almost 32,000 people.

The area around Cork is home to a number of pharmaceutical and bio-pharmaceutical companies, with a number of pharmaceutical companies located in Little Island and Ringaskiddy.

Retail
Mahon Point Shopping Centre is County Cork's largest shopping center, having opened in 2005. Infrastructural investments in the Mahon area included the extension of the N40 dual carriageway via a €137 million tunnel, the Jack Lynch Tunnel, which opened in 1999.  Construction began on the shopping centre in 2000, and opened in 2005. Other larger retail centres in the city's suburbs include Wilton Shopping Centre, Blackpool Shopping Centre, and two centres in Douglas.

Offices and business parks
Larger office buildings in the city include Half Moon Street, Penrose Dock and One Albert Quay in the city centre, with Linn Dubh and The Atrium in Blackpool, and City Gate Park in Mahon.

The larger IDA business parks in Cork City and surroundings include Little Island Business Park and Cork Airport Business Park. Other smaller parks include Cork Business and Technology Park, Kilbarry Business and Technology Park, Carrigtwohill Business and Technology Park and Ringaskiddy Business Park.

Recent city centre office developments have included One Albert Quay, consisting of 175,000 sq ft of office space over seven levels on Albert Quay. Opened in March 2016, it is home to Johnson Controls, PricewaterhouseCoopers, and Investec, and described by its developer as "Ireland's smartest building". In the city centre, a 46,000 sq ft office development was completed in January 2019 on the South Mall, and has KPMG and Forcepoint as tenants.

Planned developments
, several developments were underway within the city, with over 1,000,000 square foot of offices reportedly under construction or in the planning stages. This included the proposed €150 million development of accommodation, offices, retail and an event centre at the old Beamish and Crawford brewery site. While a "sod-turning" event was held on the site in 2016, as of 2018, construction had commenced only in certain areas of the development, with construction of the event centre delayed.

As of 2020, ongoing developments in the city included a €90 million office scheme at "Navigation Square" on Albert Quay, and a €400 million office, hotel, retail and residential development at Horgans Quay and Cork Kent railway station.

Planned developments outside the city include a proposed data centre in Little Island, and several projects around Cork Harbour. The latter included a €40m redevelopment of Spike Island as a tourist attraction, with a further €40m to clean up the former Irish Steel/Irish Ispat site on Haulbowline Island.

See also

Economy of Dublin
Economy of Belfast
Economy of Limerick
Economy of Ireland

References

Cork (city)
Economy of the Republic of Ireland